David Rowell & Co. was a company based in Westminster, London that fabricated wrought iron and wire rope, built suspension footbridges, and structural steel frame buildings. They were established in 1855 and closed in 1970.

History

The Company was formed by David Rowell in London in 1855 initially trading as a fencing business but diversifying into structural steel frame buildings. It built various bridges between 1903 and 1951. The Company was liquidated in 1970.

Wire rope and wrought iron 
Surviving catalogues from 1885 describe David Rowell & Co. as "The Iron, Wire, Wire-rope and Fencing Company", while a catalogue from 1890 describes their strained wire fences and wrought iron gates. A tram shelter by the firm was built in the 1920s at Guildhall Square in Portsmouth. It was moved to Gunwharf Quays in 2003.

Bridges

Pickhill Meadows 
This bridge was built for Oliver Ormrod of Pickhill Hall, over the River Dee at Bangor-on-Dee in November 1903, at a cost of £640 to serve "cart traffic". It is currently owned by Ormrod Estates. The lower parts of the towers were concreted in the 1970s.

Foy 

This footbridge over the River Wye at Foy,  near Ross-on-Wye, was built in 1919. It featured in the British television series Survivors, in an episode titled "Gone Away" (1975).

Bodie Creek 
Bodie Creek Bridge was built from 1924 to 1925 in the Falkland Islands, as part of a scheme to centralise sheep shearing at Goose Green. Costing £2,281, it was fabricated in London and shipped to the Islands.

Queen's Park 
Designed by William E Barker, Queen's Park Bridge was built in Chester in 1923, at a cost of £5,650. It spans , and is supported from two  diameter locked-coil cables, each capable of carrying up to 340 tons. It is founded on the north side on a 230-ton concrete block, and on the south side by anchoring into sandstone bedrock.

River Wharfe 
This bridge over the River Wharfe at Ilkley was built in 1934. The bridge is jointly owned by City of Bradford Metropolitan District Council and Yorkshire Water. Its finials were removed in 1972 when it was discovered that condensation below them was corroding the bridge cables. The bridge was refurbished in April 2001.

Other bridges 

Other bridges built by the firm include:
Sands (Hikey), Swalwell, 1903
Alum Chine, Bournemouth, 1903-4, renovated 1973, cost £480
Apley Park, 1905, also called Linley Bridge
Fron Bridge Llandyssil
Sparke Evans Park, Bristol
Castle Footbridge, Shrewsbury, 1910, replaced 1951
Llanddetty Footbridge, Talybont-on-Usk, 1910. Replaced a ferry-boat. Derelict.
Howley Bridge, Victoria Park, Warrington, 1912
Builth Wells, 1922
Llanstephan, 1922
Porthill Bridge, Shrewsbury, 1922
 Puente Orellana, El Rancho, El Progreso, Guatemala
Arapuni Suspension Bridge, Arapuni (New Zealand), 1925
Daly's bridge, Cork, Ireland, 1927
Sapper's Bridge, Betws-y-Coed, 1930
Gaol Ferry, Bristol, 1935
Thames Ditton Island, 1936
Doveridge, 1946, replaced an 1898 bridge by Louis Harper
Festival Footbridge, Aberhafesp, 1951, built to celebrate the Festival of Britain
Glanammon, Ammanford, 1958

 The Black Bridge, Torres del Paine National Park, Chile, unknown build date

Buildings 
A catalogue from the firm (possibly dating from 1873) describes their ready-made steel and iron buildings, including a "timber-framed iron church" and "galvanized corrugated iron portable houses for home or abroad".

References

External links 
Civil engineering heritage discussion list - search for David Rowell for more information
Queen's Park: at bridgemeister.com
River Wharfe: Photo at Dalesman magazine

Defunct companies of the United Kingdom
Construction and civil engineering companies of the United Kingdom
History of the City of Westminster
Manufacturing companies established in 1855
Manufacturing companies disestablished in 1970
1855 establishments in England
1970 disestablishments in England
Construction and civil engineering companies established in 1855
British companies established in 1855
British companies disestablished in 1970
Construction and civil engineering companies disestablished in 1970